Netechma crucifera is a species of moth of the family Tortricidae. It is found in Carchi Province, Ecuador.

The wingspan is 21 mm. The ground colour of the forewings is white, dotted with brown and with dark brown markings. The hindwings are whitish.

Etymology
The species name refers to the markings on the forewings and is derived from Latin crux (meaning cross) and fero (meaning I carry).

References

Moths described in 2008
Netechma